Jacobus Buys (19 November 1724 – 7 April 1801) was a Dutch painter and engraver.

Buys was born in Amsterdam the son of a wig-maker. He studied under Cornelis Pronk, Jacob de Wit, and Cornelis Troost, and ultimately became director of the Amsterdam Drawing Academy. He painted portraits, bas-reliefs, and tapestry, designed book-illustrations, and made copies of the works of the best masters of the seventeenth century. Buys became a member of Amsterdam's Guild of St Luke in 1750, and died in 1801.

References

Attribution:
 

1724 births
1801 deaths
18th-century Dutch painters
18th-century Dutch male artists
Dutch male painters
Engravers from Amsterdam
Painters from Amsterdam